The Montana Western Railway  was an American railroad. In 2003, the line was returned to the BNSF Railway, corporate successor to the Burlington Northern, and it is now operated by BNSF.

References

Defunct Montana railroads
Railway companies established in 1986
Railway companies disestablished in 2003
Predecessors of the BNSF Railway
1986 establishments in Montana